The Chelydridae is a family of turtles that has seven extinct and two extant genera. The extant genera are the snapping turtles, Chelydra and Macrochelys. Both are endemic to the Western Hemisphere. The extinct genera are Acherontemys, Chelydrops, Chelydropsis, Emarginachelys, Macrocephalochelys, Planiplastron, and Protochelydra.

Fossil history
The Chelydridae have a long fossil history, with extinct species reported from North America as well as all over Asia and Europe, far outside their present range. The earliest described chelydrid is Emarginachelys cretacea, known from well-preserved fossils from the Maastrichtian stage of the Late Cretaceous of Montana. Another well-preserved fossil chelydrid is the Late Paleocene Protochelydra zangerli from North Dakota. The carapace of P. zangerli is higher-domed than that of the recent Chelydra, a trait conjectured to be associated with the coexistence of large, turtle-eating crocodilians. Another genus, Chelydropsis, contains several well-known Eurasian chelydrid species that existed from the Oligocene to the Pliocene. In South America, chelydrids (C. acutirostris) only occupy the northwestern corner of the continent, reflecting their recent arrival from Central America as part of the Great American Interchange.

Gallery

References

 de Broin, F. (1969). Contribution a l'etude des cheloniens. Cheloniens continentaux du Cretace Superieur et du Tertiaire de France. Memoires du Muséum National d'Histoire Naturelle. Vol. C, No. XXVIII.
 Ericson, B.R. (1973). A new chelydrid turtle (Protochelydra zangerli), from the late Paleocene of North Dakota. Scientific Publications of the Science Museum of Minnesota, New Series. 2(2):1-16.
 Gaffney, E.S. (1975). Phylogeny of the chelydrid turtles: a study of shared derived characters in the skull. Fieldiana Geology 33:157-178.
 Parham, J.F., C.R. Feldman, and J.R. Boore (2006). The complete mitochondrial genome of the enigmatic bigheaded turtle (Platysternon): description of unusual genomic features and the reconciliation of phylogenetic hypotheses based on mitochondrial and nuclear DNA. BMC Evol Biol. 6: 11. Published online February 7, 2006. .
 Whetstone, K.N. (1978). A new genus of cryptodiran turtles (Testudinoidea, Chelydridae) from the Upper Cretaceous Hell Creek Formation of Montana. The University of Kansas Science Bulletin 51(17):539-563.

 
Taxa named by John Edward Gray
Reptile families
Extant Maastrichtian first appearances
Symbols of New York (state)